Samuela Marayawa is a Fijian rugby league footballer who represented Fiji in the 1995 and 2000 World Cups.

Playing career
Marayawa played in six matches for Fiji between 1994 and 2000, making his debut against France in Suva in 1994. He went on to be part of both the 1995 and 2000 World Cup squads. In 2001 he played in the Country Rugby League competition for Ourimbah.

References

Living people
Fiji national rugby league team players
Fijian rugby league players
I-Taukei Fijian people
Place of birth missing (living people)
Rugby league centres
Rugby league second-rows
Year of birth missing (living people)